Dorothea Lasky is an American poet.  
She has published four full-length collections of poetry through Wave Books and one through Liveright/W.W. Norton, along with releasing chapbooks and appearing in various literary journals. 
She is currently an Associate Professor of Poetry at Columbia University School of the Arts.

Background and education
She was born in St. Louis, Missouri in 1978. She graduated from Ladue Horton Watkins High School in 1996. She earned a BA in classics and psychology from Washington University in St. Louis.
She earned her MFA in Poetry from the University of Massachusetts Amherst's MFA Program for Poets & Writers, and her Ed.M. in Arts & Education from Harvard University, and her Ed.D. in Creativity and Education from the University of Pennsylvania.

Her work has appeared in The Paris Review,  Boston Review, and the New Yorker.

Bibliography
Full-length collections
Animal. Wave Books, 2019. 
Astro Poets: Your Guides to the Zodiac. With Alex Dimitrov. Flatiron Books, 2019. 
Milk Wave Books, 2018. 

 Ed. with Dominic Luxford and Jesse Nathan.

Rome, Liveright, 2012, 

Chapbooks & pamphlets
Snakes (Tungsten Press, 2018)
Poetry is Not a Project (Ugly Duckling Presse, 2010)
Tourmaline (Transmission Press, 2008)
The Hatmaker's Wife (2006)
Art (H NGM N Press, 2005)
Alphabets & Portraits (Anchorite Press, 2004)

References

External links
 Dorothea Lasky's personal page
 Dorothea Lasky's Author Page at Wave Books
 Dorothea Lasky's Bird in Snow, home of the Tiny Tour

 Katalanché Press
 Dorothea Lasky on PennSound
 Lasky's page at Columbia University School of the Arts

1978 births
Living people
Washington University in St. Louis alumni
University of Massachusetts Amherst MFA Program for Poets & Writers alumni
Harvard Graduate School of Education alumni
University of Pennsylvania Graduate School of Education alumni
American women poets
Columbia University faculty
Ladue Horton Watkins High School alumni
21st-century American poets
21st-century American women writers